Citizens' Movement may refer to:

 Citizens' Movement (Colombia)
Citizens' Movement (Iceland)
 Citizens' Movement (Mexico)
Citizen and Republican Movement, France
Geneva Citizens' Movement, Switzerland
Tricolour Citizens' Movement, Czech Republic

See also

 (title with the word citizen or citizens and the word movement)